Evtimov is a surname.  Notable people with the surname include:

Anton Evtimov (born 1973), Bulgarian former footballer
Dimitar Evtimov (born 1993), Bulgarian footballer
Gancho Evtimov (born 1969), Bulgarian former footballer
Ilian Evtimov (born 1983), Bulgarian professional basketball player
Konstantin Evtimov (born 1975), Bulgarian cellist
Vassil Evtimov (born 1977), French-Bulgarian retired professional basketball player

References